Holbox Aerodrome (DGAC Code: HOL) is a small private airport for public use located on the island of the same name in Quintana Roo and is operated by the air taxi company Aerosaab. It has a runway 660 meters long and 12 meters wide, a platform with capacity for up to 5 light twin-engine aircraft and a waiting room. It is currently only used for general aviation purposes.

Incidents
On April 14, 2013, a Cessna 177 aircraft with registration XB-IHT that was preparing to make a flight between Holbox Aerodrome and Mérida International Airport encountered crosswinds during its takeoff run, causing the pilot to lose control of the aircraft and eventually collapsed, causing major damage to the aircraft, however the pilot and the 3 passengers were uninjured. Before the accident, the DGAC issued recommendations about signaling improvements at the aerodrome with more than one wind cone, in addition to improving pilot training.

On July 25, 2020, a Cessna 208B Grand Caravan aircraft with registration XA-FTG operated by AX Transporter that was covering a flight between Cancun Airport and Holbox Aerodrome impacted the perimeter fence of a softball field after failing to brake properly at the aerodrome. The 2 crew members and the 5 passengers were uninjured. The aircraft sustained substantial damage.

On March 30, 2021, a Cessna T206H Stationair TC aircraft with registration XA-UPC operated by XOMEX Transportes Aéreos, which was making a local exhibition flight for a private event, stalled and later crashed into Laguna Nichupté, killing both pilots and the two passengers survived.

See also

List of airports in Mexico

References

Airports in Mexico